Stanley Waithaka Mburu (born 9 April 2000) is a Kenyan male long-distance runner who competes in the 5000 metres and 10,000 metres

Mburu enjoyed his first international success at the 2017 IAAF World U18 Championships, taking a bronze medal in the 3000 metres behind Ethiopia's Selemon Barega and Kenyan compatriot Edward Zakayo. The following year he made his debut on the 2018 IAAF Diamond League circuit, taking third in the 5000 metres with a personal best of 13:10.14 minutes. This time ranked him in the top twenty for the distance that year. At the 2018 IAAF World U20 Championships he was again bested by Zakayo, making it a Kenyan 1–2 in the 5000 m final, while reigning U18 champion Selemon Barega finished out of the medals. Mburu won at the Palio Città della Quercia meet in August, but failed to finish at the more prestigious Memorial Van Damme race.

Mburu moved to Japan in late 2018 and began to compete for the Yakult corporate team. In November he ran 27:13.01 minutes for the 10,000 metres, which was the fastest time by any athlete that year.
In 2022 World Athletics Championship in Eugene, Oregon, Mburu finished second in the 10000 meters behind Uganda's Joshua Cheptegei.

International competitions

Personal bests
Outdoor

 From World Athletics Profile

References

External links

2000 births
Living people
Kenyan male long-distance runners
Place of birth missing (living people)